Ariel "Arik" Ze'evi (born 16 January 1977) is a retired Israeli dan 6 black belt in Judo. He had a long and successful career competing in half-heavyweight Judo competitions. He is an Olympic bronze medal finalist in the 2004 Summer Olympics Judo 100 kg class in Athens.

Biography
Ze'evi is Jewish, and was born and raised in Bnei Brak, Israel, a predominantly Orthodox Jewish city in the Tel Aviv metropolitan area.

While growing up, he trained in the local Judo club in his neighborhood, together with his older brother, Roni, who was also the club's first local gold medal pioneer after having finished first in the national Israeli Judo Championships. Ze'evi, heavily influenced by his brother and his accomplishment, began training intensively, and at the age of 15 won his first national competition in the adult class, becoming the country's youngest champion ever. Despite the lack of advanced training facilities, Ze'evi continued training in his local club and steadily closed the gap to world class level, and began competing abroad.

In his personal life, Ze'evi obtained a LLB degree from the Interdisciplinary Center college, in Herzliya.

He also hosted a sports television show for the Israeli Broadcasting Authority.

Judo career
Ze'evi won a bronze medal in judo in the U95 at the 1997 Maccabiah Games.

Ze'evi placed 5th competing for Israel at the 2000 Summer Olympics in the men's 100 kg division, before winning the bronze medal representing Israel at the 2004 Summer Olympics in Athens in the men's 100 kg division.

He is the 2001, 2003, 2004 and 2012 European champion and the 2005 silver medalist. Ze'evi also won the silver medal in the open category in the 2001 World Championships.

He missed the 2005 World championships in Cairo due to a shoulder injury, and subsequently underwent surgery to repair the damage.

Representing Israel at the 2008 Summer Olympics in Beijing, he failed to win a medal after losing his second match in the repechage bracket. Ze'evi told the Israeli media he does not want to end his career without a victory (probably hinting at the Judo World Championships in 2009).

According to the International Judo Federation's World Ranking List, as of April 2012, Zeevi was ranked #8.

He became the champion of Europe for the fourth time in 2012, winning the competition in Chelyabinsk, Russia.

Achievements

See also
List of select Jewish judokas
List of Israelis

References

External links

 
 
 
 
 
 
 

1977 births
Living people
Israeli male judoka
Competitors at the 1997 Maccabiah Games
Maccabiah Games medalists in judo
Maccabiah Games bronze medalists for Israel
Olympic judoka of Israel
Judoka at the 2000 Summer Olympics
Judoka at the 2004 Summer Olympics
Judoka at the 2008 Summer Olympics
Judoka at the 2012 Summer Olympics
Olympic bronze medalists for Israel
Jewish martial artists
People from Bnei Brak
Olympic medalists in judo
Israeli Jews
Reichman University alumni
Medalists at the 2004 Summer Olympics